Kingstown is the capital city of Saint Vincent and the Grenadines.

Kingstown may also refer to:

Places

Australia
Kingstown, New South Wales

Ireland
Dún Laoghaire, Ireland, named Kingstown from 1821 until 1921

United Kingdom 
 Kingstown, a townland in County Fermanagh, Northern Ireland

United States
Kingstown, Maryland
Kingstown, North Carolina
North Kingstown, Rhode Island
South Kingstown, Rhode Island

Organisations
Kingstown Radio, a radio station in Kingston upon Hull, England

See also
 
Kington (disambiguation)
Kingston (disambiguation)
Kingstone (disambiguation)